The 2022 Pinatar Cup was the second edition of the Pinatar Cup, an international women's football friendly tournament, that was held from 16 to 22 February 2022 in San Pedro del Pinatar, Region of Murcia, Spain.

Format
The eight invited teams played in a knockout stage, starting with the quarter-finals. From there on, the teams were split into a winning and lower bracket.

Teams
Eight teams participated.

Squads

Results
All times are local (UTC+1).

Bracket

Quarter-finals

5–8th place semi-finals

Semi-finals

Seventh place game

Fifth place game

Third place game

Final

Final ranking

Goalscorers

References

2020 Pinatar Cup
2021–22 in Spanish women's football
2022 in women's association football
Pinatar Cup
February 2022 sports events in Spain